The  St. John's A.F. & A.M. Lodge, also known as Tyler Masonic Lodge, refers to a Masonic Lodge in Tyler, Texas and also to its historic building, which is listed on the National Register of Historic Places.

The building, located on Front Street in Tyler, Texas, was built in 1902 by St. John's Lodge #53, a local Masonic lodge (the lodge still meets in the building).

The building was designed in Colonial Revival architecture by architect Shirley Simons.  It was listed on the National Register in 2005.  The listing included one contributing building and one contributing structure.

See also

National Register of Historic Places listings in Smith County, Texas

References

Colonial Revival architecture in Texas
Masonic buildings completed in 1902
Buildings and structures in Tyler, Texas
Masonic buildings in Texas
Clubhouses on the National Register of Historic Places in Texas
National Register of Historic Places in Smith County, Texas